Jordan Michael Taylor (born September 30, 1989) is an American professional basketball player for London Lions of the British Basketball League (BBL) and the EuroCup.

High school career
Named Minnesota Mr. Basketball as a senior, averaging 22.3 points and 7.1 assists per game. Led Benilde-St. Margaret's to the Minnesota state Class AAA title in 2008 and was a 2-time all-state and 4-time all-conference honoree. He is also the All-time leading scorer in Benilde-St. Margaret's history with 2,068 points over his career.  Took his school to a runner-up finish as a junior, earning North Suburban Conference MVP and Class AAA All-Tournament that year and averaged 19.5 points, 6.2 assists and 5.5 rebounds as a junior. Was named honorable mention all-state as a sophomore. Was a member of the National Honor Society and earned the Minnesota State High School League Outstanding Academic Achievement Award.

Collegiate career
Taylor was one of eleven finalists for the 2011 Bob Cousy Award which is given to the nation's top point guard.

Taylor was awarded 2nd team All-American by Yahoo Sports. He was joined by guards Kemba Walker of Connecticut and Ben Hansbrough of Notre Dame also forwards Derrick Williams of Arizona and Kawhi Leonard of San Diego State. He was picked to the First Team All-America by Fox Sports.

For the 2011–12 season, Taylor was named to multiple preseason watchlists:
Wooden Award Top 50 list
All-Big Ten team
All-American team (AP, Blue Ribbon Yearbook and Athlon Magazine)
Naismith Trophy Top 50 list

On February 26, 2012, Taylor scored 19 points in an upset win over then 10th ranked Ohio State in Columbus. Taylor then moved into 10th place on Wisconsin's all-time scoring list with 1,418 points. He passed both Cory Blackwell (1,405) and Clarence Sherrod (1,408) during the game. The next game on February 28, Taylor scored 22 points in a win over Minnesota. Taylor then moved into 9th place on Wisconsin's all-time scoring list passing Devin Harris.

On March 22, 2012, Taylor played in his final college basketball game losing in the sweet sixteen to the number one seeded Syracuse Orange, 64–63. In this game, Taylor made 23 three-pointers in NCAA Tournament games for his career. Taylor broke the school record of 19, held by Jon Bryant. Taylor also broke the all-time NCAA assist-to-turnover ratio.

Professional career
After going undrafted in 2012, Taylor agreed to play for the Atlanta Hawks in the 2012 NBA Summer League.

On August 6, 2012, Taylor signed with Virtus Roma of the Italian League. In the 2012–13 season, he averaged 11.5 points, 2.8 rebounds and 3.7 assists  He parted ways with them on February 5, 2014, after averaging 11.2 points, 2.7 rebounds and 3.9 assists in 16 games

In 2014, Taylor agreed to play for the Milwaukee Bucks Summer League team.

He spent the 2014–15 season with Hapoel Holon in Israel where he averaged 14.5 points, 2.9 rebounds and 4.5 assists.

On August 7, 2015, Taylor signed with Alba Berlin in Germany. After one season, he parted ways with Alba. He averaged 11.5 points, 2.8 rebounds and 11.1 assists in 33 games with the team.

On December 28, 2016, Taylor returned to Hapoel Holon. He averaged 10.2 points, 3.3 rebounds and 4.1 assists in his return to the team.

On November 3, 2017, Taylor signed with Turkish club Galatasaray.

On July 2, 2019, he has signed with ASVEL of the LNB Pro A. Taylor signed with Levanga Hokkaido of the Japanese B.League on July 7, 2020.

On July 14, 2022, he signed with U-BT Cluj-Napoca of the Liga Națională and the EuroCup.

On December 12, 2022, he signed with London Lions of the British Basketball League (BBL).

Personal life
Jordan was born in Bloomington, Minnesota to parents are Louis and Lezlie Taylor. Jordan has one older brother, Brandon (38). Prep teammate of Armond Battle (University of Tulsa) at Benilde-St. Margaret's and majored in business marketing.

College statistics

|-
| style="text-align:left;"| 2008–09
| style="text-align:left;"| Wisconsin Badgers
| 33 || 0 || 13.2 || 26.0 || 19.2 || 58.8 || 0.9 || 1.2 || 0.3 || 0.0 || 1.6
|-
| style="text-align:left;"| 2009-10
| style="text-align:left;"| Wisconsin Badgers
| 33 || 17 || 29.5 || 39.5 || 32.7 || 71.8 || 3.2 || 3.6 || 0.9 || 0.1 || 10.0
|-
| style="text-align:left;"| 2010-11
| style="text-align:left;"| Wisconsin Badgers
| 34 || 34 || 36.5 || 43.3 || 42.9 || 83.2 || 4.1 || 4.7 || 0.7 || 0.1 || 18.1
|-
| style="text-align:left;"| 2011-12
| style="text-align:left;"| Wisconsin Badgers
| 36 || 36 || 36.0 || 40.2 || 36.9 || 78.5 || 3.8 || 4.1 || 1.0 || 0.0 || 14.8

References

External links
 Italian League profile
 Wisconsin bio

1989 births
Living people
Alba Berlin players
All-American college men's basketball players
American expatriate basketball people in France
American expatriate basketball people in Germany
American expatriate basketball people in Israel
American expatriate basketball people in Italy
American expatriate basketball people in Turkey
American men's basketball players
ASVEL Basket players
Basketball players from Minnesota
CS Universitatea Cluj-Napoca (men's basketball) players
Galatasaray S.K. (men's basketball) players
Hapoel Holon players
Levanga Hokkaido players
Limoges CSP players
Pallacanestro Virtus Roma players
Point guards
Sportspeople from Bloomington, Minnesota
Wisconsin Badgers men's basketball players